Jeir is a rural locality in the Southern Tablelands of New South Wales, Australia in the Yass Valley Shire. It is north of Canberra and south of Yass and Murrumbateman on the western side of the Barton Highway and the eastern side of the Murrumbidgee River.

References

Localities in New South Wales
Yass Valley Council
Southern Tablelands